Konami Classics Vol. 1 and Konami Classics Vol. 2 are retail packages of three Xbox Live Arcade games. The disc works by inserting it into the console just like any other game. However, rather than directly launching any of the titles, it adds three items to the Xbox Live Arcade menu with a small disc icon next to each name.

Games

Vol. 1

Vol. 2

See also
 Konami 80's Arcade Gallery - Also titled Konami Arcade Classics and Konami 80's AC Special.
 Konami Antiques MSX Collection
 Konami Classics Series: Arcade Hits - Also titled Konami Arcade Classics in Europe.
 Konami Collector's Series: Arcade Advanced
List of Konami games
 Capcom Digital Collection
 Namco Museum Virtual Arcade
 PopCap Arcade
 Xbox Live Arcade Unplugged

References

2009 video games
Xbox 360-only games
Xbox 360 Live Arcade games
Konami video game compilations
Video games developed in Japan
Xbox 360 games
Xbox 360 Live Arcade compilations